Manouchehr Hakim (died 1981) was an Iranian physician and anatomist. Hakim was the founder and head of the Department of Anatomy at the University of Tehran.

References

Iranian physiologists
Iranian anatomists
1981 deaths